Rickmers may refer to:

People 

 Erck Rickmers, a German businessman and politician

Ships 

 R. C. Rickmers (1906), a German five-masted steel clipper barque
 Rickmer Rickmers, a museum ship in Hamburg, Germany
SS Claus Rickmers, a cargo ship which was built in 1923 for Rickmers Reederei AG

Other uses 

 Rickmers Group, an international provider of services for the maritime industry